The Head of Gonzalez is a 1920 German silent film directed by Franz Osten.

It was made at the Emelka Studios in Munich.

Cast
 Else Bodenheim 
 Fritz Greiner

References

Bibliography
 Sanjit Narwekar. Directory of Indian film-makers and films. Flicks Books, 1994.

External links

1920 films
Films of the Weimar Republic
Films directed by Franz Osten
German silent feature films
German black-and-white films